The FIBA U18 European Championship, originally known as the European Championship for Juniors, is a youth men's basketball competition that was inaugurated with the 1964 edition. It was held biennially through the 2002 edition. From the 2004 edition onward, it has been held every year. It serves as the qualification tournament for the FIBA Under-19 World Cup, for the FIBA Europe region. The current champions are Spain.

Division A

Results

Medal table

Source:
1 Since 1992, Czechoslovakia, the Soviet Union and Yugoslavia are defunct.
2 FR Yugoslavia was formed in 1992 and renamed to Serbia and Montenegro in 2003. As of 2006, Serbia and Montenegro is defunct.
3 Commonwealth of Independent States (CIS) competed only in 1992.

Participating nations

 As FR Yugoslavia (1992–2002, 2 participations, 1 medal) and as Serbia and Montenegro (2003–2006, 3 participations, 1 medal)

MVP Awards (since 1998)

Division B

Results

 Since 2012, the 3rd team in Division B is also promoted to Division A for the next tournament.

Medal table

Participating nations

Division C

Results

Medal table

See also
FIBA U16 European Championship
FIBA U20 European Championship

References

Archive FIBA

External links
Official website
Draws completed for FIBA U18 European Championships 2017 Divisions A and B

 
Basketball competitions in Europe between national teams
Europe